Alaverdoba (translit. alaverdoba) is a 1962 Georgian Art drama film directed by Giorgi Shengelaia. The film story set in around Alaverdi Monastery, Kakheti. Protagonist Guram goes there in order to see firsthand the ancient Georgian religious feast Alaverdoba.

Cast
Geidar Palavandishvili	as Gurami
Kote Daushvili as Lezghin
Irakli Kokrashvili as Salesman
Leo Balisevich as Driver
Nodar Piranishvili as Hairdresser
Kote Toloraia as Qisti

References

External links

1962 films
1962 drama films
Drama films from Georgia (country)
Georgian-language films
Films directed by Giorgi Shengelaia
1960s avant-garde and experimental films